Come Walk with Me is the sixth studio album by the American vocalist, pianist and songwriter Oleta Adams and was released in 1997.

History
Come Walk with Me is Adams' first gospel music album. Adams, being the daughter of a minister, had been trained in singing gospel music since she was a child, and sang at her local church choir. Gospel music was always a strong influence in her previous recordings, but it was never fully explored as in this album.

It was her first album after leaving Mercury Records, which had released her previous three studio albums and a compilation. Adams signed to Christian music label Harmony Records to release the album. The record was co-produced by Adams and Michael J. Powell, who had also produced some songs on Adams' previous album Moving On.

The album was well-received critically, and charted in the top 10 of the US Billboard Gospel and Christian charts. The songs "Holy Is the Lamb" and "This Love Won't Fail" were released as radio-only singles.

Adams contributed the Christmas song "A Child Was Born Into My Life" for a compilation album titled Christmas Harmony in 1998, after which she left Harmony Records.

Track listing

Personnel 
 Oleta Adams – vocals, acoustic piano, additional keyboards, backing vocals (4, 5, 8), arrangements, producer, liner notes
 Michael J. Powell – keyboard programming, guitars, percussion, producer, mixing
 Vernon D. Fails – Fender Rhodes (1-8, 10), synthesizers (1-8, 10)
 Van Cephus – Hammond organ (5, 9, 10)
 Curtiss Boone – Moog synthesizer solo (8)
 Al Turner – bass guitar
 John Cushon – drums, percussion, drum programming
 Paul Riser – string arrangements and conductor (7)
 J. Edward Hoy – arrangements (10)
 Rodney Barber, Derrick L. Brown, Vanessa Durrah, Lajuana B. Henderson, Sandra Hudson, Iva Johnson, Donald Lawrence, Erica McCollough, Arnetta Murill-Crooms, Sharla L. Reed, Tami Y. Spann, LeJuene Thompson, Eric Young and Michael A. Young – choir (1, 6)
 Special Gift [LaTonya Holman, Donyle Jones, Kayla D. Parker and Meri Thomas] – backing vocals (2)
 Kayla D. Parker – BGV arrangements (2)
 Eric Dawkins – backing vocals (4)
 Leslie Ferguson – backing vocals (5, 8)
 Jerry Davis – backing vocals (5, 8)
 Raina Bundy – executive producer
 Gerard Smerek – engineer, mixing
 Greg Henley – assistant engineer
 George Marino – mastering at Sterling Sound (New York, NY).
 David Bett – art direction
 Danny Clinch – photography
 Gallin Morey Associates – management

Charts

1997 albums
Oleta Adams albums
Gospel albums by American artists
Albums produced by Michael J. Powell